The 1982 UNLV Rebels football team was an American football team that represented the University of Nevada, Las Vegas in the Pacific Coast Athletic Association during the 1982 NCAA Division I-A football season. In their first year under head coach Harvey Hyde, the team compiled a 3–8 record (1–4 in PCAA, sixth).

Hired in December 1981, Hyde was previously the head coach at Pasadena City College. Formerly an independent, this was the Rebels' first season in the PCAA.

Schedule

References

UNLV
UNLV Rebels football seasons
UNLV Rebels football